The 2008 Team Speedway Junior World Championship was the fourth FIM World Team Junior Championship. The final took place on 21 September 2008, in Holsted, Denmark. The championship was won by the Polish junior team who were the defending champions from 2007. Denmark finished in second place and Sweden were third.

Calendar

Qualification

Semifinal 1
 June 7, 2008
  Pardubice
 Referee:  Jesper Steentoft
 Jury President:  Boris Kotnjek

Semifinal 2
 June 22, 2008
  Diedenbergen
 Referee:  Craig Ackroyd
 Jury President:  Janos Nadasdi

Final 
 September 21, 2008
  Holsted
Referee:  Mick Bates
Jury President:  Christer Bergström

References

See also 
 2008 Speedway World Cup

2008
World Team Junior